San Marino Baseball Club is a professional domestic baseball club based in San Marino. As of August 2021, they compete in Serie A1, the top tier of Italian baseball. Their current commercial name is T & A San Marino, because the team is primarily sponsored by Italian company Tecnologie e Ambiente S.A. They are currently being managed by Mario Chiarini.

History 
Baseball first got an audience in the 1960s, where some Sammarinese boys returning from the United States introduced it to their peers. A first San Marino Baseball Club was founded in 1970, where they entered Italian league Serie D, and promoted to the next tier Serie C four years later in 1974, and finally arriving in Serie C in 1980. In 1985, the club was transformed into a newer one, and the team entered Serie A1 Italian championships, the top series of Italian baseball where the team has played ever since. In 1992, the team made their first international debut, where they qualified to compete in the European Baseball Cup. Ever since, the team have competed in the international tournament and have remained securely in Serie A1. San Marino now organize teams to enter Italian youth tournaments, where many additional titles have been won.

Ballpark 

T & A San Marino play home games at the Stadio di Baseball di Serravalle baseball stadium. It is located in Serravalle and has a capacity of 1,500. The venue was used in the 2016 European Cup to co-host the games along with Italy. The stadium was constructed in 1986, and renovated for the European Cup. When the stadium reaches capacity, there is a hill on the side of the venue which can host spectators on the grass if required.

The stadium has been the home of T & A San Marino for almost all of their history since 1985 where they were transformed into the current club.

Competitions 
T & A San Marino often appear in the European Baseball Cup, with five final appearances and three victories in total.

The team also competes in the Serie A1 Italian baseball league, where they have won the title four times in total.

References

1985 establishments in San Marino
Sports clubs established in 1985
Baseball teams in Europe
Sports teams in San Marino
Baseball in San Marino
Sport in the City of San Marino